Lovers is a 1983 Indian Hindi-language romantic drama film directed by Bharathiraja. It is a remake of his own 1981 Tamil film Alaigal Oivathillai.

Plot
Viju lives near Panji, Goa, with his poor mother, who teaches music to make a living. Mary, sister of a rich landlord David comes home from Bombay to visit her family during her vacations. The two characters fall in love with each other. On getting to know this, David beats Mary black-and-blue and plans to get her married. During these events, David violates his maid and cleanly gets away with it. But this earns him his wife Eliza's wrath, and she tries to help Mary unite with Viju against the wishes of David.

David then attempts to kill both Viju and Mary with the help of the villagers, as he feels the only punishment that they deserve for loving each other, is death. Will the lovers ever unite, or will they be constantly torn apart due to the various odds and obstacles of the society, is what forms the rest of the story.

Cast
 Kumar Gaurav as Viju 
 Padmini Kolhapure as Mary 
 Danny Denzongpa as David 
 Tanuja as Eliza 
 Rajendra Kumar as Christian Priest
 Beena Banerjee as Viju's Mother
 Rakesh Bedi as Fatty
 Mehmood Junior as Viju's Friend
 Neelu Arora as Lalita
 Sudha Chopra as David's Neighbour
 Dinesh Hingoo as Gangu
 Kamaldeep as Doctor
 Satyendra Kapoor as Shambhu

Soundtrack

References

External links 
 

1983 films
1980s Hindi-language films
Indian romantic drama films
Films scored by R. D. Burman
Indian teen romance films
Films directed by Bharathiraja
Hindi remakes of Tamil films
Indian interfaith romance films